John F. Munro (1849-1930) was a British professor of mechanical engineering at Bristol and author who wrote the science fiction stories A Trip to Venus (1897), Sun-Rise in the Moon (1894) and A Message from Mars (1895). A Message from Mars was included as the first chapter of A Trip to Venus, and A Trip to Venus was included in Farewell Fantastic Venus by Brian Aldiss and Harry Harrison. Munro also wrote Heroes of the Telegraph (1891) and other historical and reference books, such as A pocket-book of electrical rules and tables for the use of electricians and engineers (1884). Because they were published before 1925, most of Munro's works are in the public domain.

Works

Science fiction 
 A Trip to Venus, 1897
 A Message from Mars, in the March issue of Cassell's Magazine in 1895
 Sun-Rise in the Moon, in the October issue of Cassell's Magazine in 1894

Electricity and Technology 
 Electricity and Its Uses, 1887
 The Wire and the Wave
 Pioneers of Electricity, 1890
 Heroes of the Telegraph, 1891
 The Story of Electricity, 1902
 Romance of Electricity, 1893
 A pocket-book of electrical rules and tables for the use of electricians and engineers by John Munro and Andrew Jamieson, 1894

Other 
 The Story of the British race, 1909
 Lord Kelvin, G.C.V.O. (biography), 1902

References

External links 

British mechanical engineers
British science fiction writers
1849 births
1930 deaths
Writers from Bristol
Engineers from Bristol